This is the list of major and minor recurring characters in the HBO comedy-drama television series Entourage. This list focuses on the characters themselves whether they are real people or fictional characters.  For the complete list of celebrity appearances and cameos see the List of celebrities appearing on Entourage. Characters with links indicate the actual actor/actress in the role.

Major recurring characters

Lloyd Lee
A gay Mongolian-American with an art history degree from Sarah Lawrence College and MBA from Stanford Business School, Lloyd first appeared in the second season as Ari's assistant. Unlike with Ari's previous assistants, he is able to endure his boss' frequent barbs at his sexual orientation and ethnicity. When Ari is fired in the episode "Exodus," Lloyd is the only one who joins him on the way out and works for Ari's new agency in the third season. Over the course of the season, he continues to prove himself on the job, booking Drama's role in the new NBC series Five Towns. Ari eventually earns Lloyd's gratitude when he rescues Lloyd from a gay TV writer who wanted to take advantage of him and reunites him with his boyfriend after a breakup in the fourth season. Having spent years as Ari's assistant by the time of the sixth season, Lloyd tries to talk to him about a promotion. Ari makes him endure a series of challenges over 100 days, which proves so hard for Lloyd, that he leaves Ari to take up Adam Davies' offer to work at TMA. Ari responds in the episode "Berried Alive" by ensuring that nobody in Hollywood will work with Lloyd again, starting with his attempt to sign Drama as a client after he is taken off Five Towns. When the Miller-Gold Agency merges with TMA in the season 6 finale "Give A Little Bit," Ari finally promotes Lloyd as an agent. Lloyd continues to work under him into the seventh season. In the final season, Ari makes Lloyd the interim chief of TMA's TV division upon the condition that he will task the Mad Men production staff to derail the audition of a waiter Ari mistakes as dating his wife. As Ari steps down from TMA in the series finale, Lloyd is surprised and confronts Ari for not letting him know early on, telling Ari that he was his inspiration. Ari exhorts Lloyd to continue working at TMA under Babs Miller. In the movie, Ari agrees to give away Lloyd at his wedding. Played by Rex Lee (74 Episodes)

Melissa 'Mrs Ari' Gold
A former soap actress turned Beverly Hills socialite, Melissa Gold, known for most of the show's run as "Mrs. Ari", is Ari's long-suffering wife and the mother of his children. She is strong enough to stand up to Ari's intimidating personality, and is in charge of the homestead. It is revealed in season 3 that the two first met at Harvard years before the events of the series and that she came from a rich Jewish family who left her a sizable trust fund (which Ari dips into to finance his new agency). In season 4, she receives a call from the producers of the soap opera The Young and the Restless to reprise her old role of Kendall Scott for a one-day comeback but turns down a full-time role to concentrate on raising her children. In season five, it is revealed that Melissa once featured in an erotic film that Ari tried to hide, but Adam Davies posted a picture from the film on the web. Mrs Ari has been shown to fully support her husband in his decisions through thick and thin, although in season 6, she is disgusted with Ari lying to her about Andrew Klein cheating on his wife Marlo (whom she had become close friends with). In the season 6 finale "Give A Little Bit," Mrs Ari refuses to give Ari additional money to buy out the Terrance McQuewick Agency because of his admission of wanting to avenge his firing years before, but she is convinced to lend him the money for business reasons. The marital problems that built up in season 7 prompts Mrs Ari to separate from Ari and files for divorce while seeing Bobby Flay for most of the eighth season. However, Mrs Ari breaks up with Flay and reconciles with Ari in the series finale.

Mrs. Ari is a recurring guest star in the first three seasons and a credited star in the intro of Season 4. Creator/Producer/Head Writer Doug Ellin stated that the change in the introduction credits is the work of HBO. He added in many interviews and on various DVD commentaries that Mrs. Ari will never get a first name in the show. In the eighth season, however, it is finally revealed that her first name is Melissa. Ellin based Mrs Ari's name on his wife, Melissa Hecht. Reeves was brought into the cast while she was shooting Mr and Mrs Smith. Played by Perrey Reeves (68 Episodes)

Shauna Roberts
Vince's publicist and his self-appointed "West-Coast mother", Shauna is a brutally honest woman who speaks her mind to Vince and the boys. She is a recurring guest star over the course of the show. While working in Vince's camp, she is seen to have raised two children. In the fifth season, Shauna steps in to help Vince's income stream by encouraging him to appear at a sweet sixteen party for USD200,000. In the final season, she assists Vince with the damage control in light of an article Vanity Fair reporter Sophia Lear wrote about him. Creator/Producer/Head Writer Doug Ellin has stated the change in the introduction credits is the work of HBO. Played by Debi Mazar. (36 Episodes)

Sloan McQuewick
First appearing in the second season, Sloan is Terrance McQuewick's daughter, to whom E takes a liking. Although they hit it off well in seasons 2 and 3, Sloan is disappointed when E moves in with her by the end of the season 3 finale but does not fully unpack his belongings. They broke up in the period between seasons 3 and 4 when E returns from the Medellin shoot and suddenly goes with the gang to Italy. Sloan reappears in the fifth season as E seeks her help in convincing Seth Green - who taunts E about his supposed past with her - to accept a role in a new show. Despite helping E lease one of her friends' houses to him in the sixth season and also land him a new job with her godfather, Sloan admits that she cannot get back with him unless they can really determine what they want from each other. A long fight on the road in the season 6 finale results in Sloan accepting E's marriage proposal. The couple plan their wedding for most of the seventh season, but they break up again during the interim of Seasons 7 and 8 because of Terrance's prenup demand as well as the takeover at Murray Berenson. In the final season, it is revealed that Sloan and E did not part amicably and spend one romantic moment together before E discovers Sloan will move to New York. When she is found to be carrying Eric's baby, Turtle, Drama, and Vince ask her to give E - whom she still loves - another chance and gets on a plane with him to an undisclosed location when Vince goes to Paris to get married. Played by Emmanuelle Chriqui. (28 Episodes)

Billy Walsh
Making his debut in the Season 1 episode "The Scene," Walsh is first hired by Vince to direct his upcoming movie, Queens Boulevard, on account of his triumph at the Sundance Film Festival with his indie movie Daze. He partially rewrites the script to include a scene in which Vince's character has a homosexual encounter. The boys worry over the scene, but Walsh persuades Vince of its viability as a test of his commitment to the project - by admitting that the scene will not be made at all. The team shoots the movie in New York during the interlude between Seasons 1 and 2.

In season 2, Walsh aims for a second Sundance trophy by successfully submitting Queens Boulevard for exhibition, but defiantly insists that James Cameron - whom Vince wants to meet to firmly land the title role in Aquaman - watch it at the festival instead of sending him a print. The movie is eventually well received. In the third season, the studio prepares to release QB for a wider audience, but Walsh seeks an injunction because the general-release version would be colorized; it is implied that he was denied the injunction. Late in the season, the gang brings back Walsh - who is working as a porn film director - to direct the shooting of Medellin after he reads the script, knowing his ability to make quality films with small budgets. He agrees on the condition that he will have final cut. He later decides it will be shot in Spanish.

In the fourth season, the gang goes down to Colombia to shoot Medellin. However, Walsh falls apart on the set over the course of the shoot, with some of his antics include banning cellphones during production meetings, violently firing a director of photography for poorly shooting a scene, conducting witch hunts to see who may have seduced a local woman (Sofia Vergara) hired for the shoot, and tapping Stephen Gaghan to help him rewrite the ending when he already revised it. Billy finishes filming the final scene of the movie, a military assault scene that he is pleased with. Walsh's conflicts in Colombia with E, whom he derisively calls "suit," continue in Los Angeles for most of the season. Per his final cut authority, he avoids Vince and E from showing them the first cut and also refuses to consider editing it further after they see it. The Cannes Film Festival committee also accepts Medellin for screening, but not before Walsh gets angry at E for supposedly leaking the copy of a trailer (it is revealed that an editor's girlfriend did). Walsh hires Ari as his agent after Ari signs him, Vince and E to do a new movie, Lost in the Clouds. Knowing E's pledge to never work with Walsh again, Vince tries to get Walsh off the movie. Walsh fires Ari over a threat about being sued for breach of contract because he disposed the Lost in the Clouds script to make an entirely new script for a sci-fi film called Silo. Upon learning that Anna Faris is being managed by E, Walsh tries to get her aboard for the film, but she does not understand the script. He joins the gang in flying to Cannes for the Medellin premiere in the season finale "The Cannes Kids" but as with Cameron in Queens Boulevard, he refuses to let Yair Marx see the film. E's warnings about a failure to edit the film come back to haunt him as the audience jeers away at Medellin after the world premiere. It is implied that this failure has resulted in the cancellation of the Silo project and it effectively ends Walsh's movie career.

Billy returns in the season 7 episode "Hair" looking to find work again to feed his family. He explains that he had spent the past two years reforming his ways - including being an ordained minister - and specifically approaches E for help. Over the rest of the season, Billy works with Drama to create a new animated series called Johnny's Bananas. In the final season, Walsh is temporarily rankled that Drama and Andrew Dice Clay's labor strike could cost him his job. He also steps in to fix Vince's miner movie script and to direct it as well. The final fate of the project is left unknown with the ending of the series.

According to interviews on the season 2 DVD, the Billy character was inspired mainly by American television producer "Mad Skillz Tommy Schillz" Tom Schiller of Norwood, New Jersey. With bits of Entourage writer Rob Weiss as well as Vincent Gallo sprinkled in. Played by Rhys Coiro (23 Episodes)

Barbara "Babs" Miller 
First appearing as Mandy Moore's agent in the second season, Babs is depicted as Ari Gold's mentor years before the events of the series. In the first half of season 3, Babs alerts Ari about the growing opposition to his creation of a new agency and comes to his aid after Terrence McQuewick  denies him the money. Ari and Babs agrees to a 51/49 partnership in the new Miller-Gold Agency (MGA), where they must both agree on hiring or firing employees. They periodically get at odds with each other over various company issues during the next two seasons. In the fifth season, after she discovers Ari being offered the presidency of Warner Brothers, Babs tells Ari she will pay him ten cents per every dollar he invested in the agency. She also objects to Ari's plans to merge MGA with Andrew Klein's Klein-Cutler Talent Agency despite its profitability and clean finances. She eventually relents and agrees to the buyout as long as Ari will take care of Klein's wages.

In season 6, Barbara wants to fire Klein after she sees him walking around the agency in his robe and threatens to do so unless he can sign Aaron Sorkin by the end of the day. Although Klein does land the job, Barbara begins to think less of him. In the seventh season, Babs works with Ari in dealing with the NFL and fallout from the disclosure of Lizzie Grant's blackmail. In the series finale, Ari lets her take over TMA as he resigns to spend time with his family. Played by Beverly D'Angelo. (23 Episodes)

Dana Gordon
First appearing in Season 2 as the vice-president for production at Warner Brothers, Dana works with Ari to help Vincent Chase secure the role for Aquaman. The working relationship comes to a short end by the conclusion of season 3's first half when Ari's admission to Bob Ryan about Dana's information on the final fate of his Ramones film script gets her fired. Dana is accepted as an executive in another studio in the fourth season, where she clashes with Billy Walsh and Ari regarding the treatment of a script Walsh rewrote into an entirely new movie. She also avoids buying Medellin for distribution after the film's failure at the Cannes Film Festival. In the fifth season, Dana lands the presidency of Warner Brothers with Ari's help. The success of the maneuver results in Dana securing Vince for the film Smoke Jumpers, but issues with director Verner Vollstedt eventually lead to the project's cancellation despite Dana's attempts to get him in line. In Season 7, Dana is rebuffed by Ari over Vince's drug test ordered by Air-Walker director Randell Wallace, who later resigns and Peter Berg assumes the director's chair.

Over the course of the series, various exchanges between Ari and Dana hint at a romantic and sexual relationship in the early 1990s. Ari also joked to Dana in the seventh season about her becoming the woman he would like to fool around with if he decides to cheat on Mrs. Ari. In the final season, it is revealed that the two were lovers until September 1992. At the time, Dana wanted to marry Ari, who broke up with her so he can marry who eventually became Mrs. Ari. The repercussions from Ari and Mrs. Ari's separation at the start of the eighth season prompts him to seek solace once again in Dana's arms. Both regretted walking away from each other years before and try to make their renewed relationship work, even as Mrs. Ari files for divorce. The attempts fail, especially after Dana encounters Ari's children at the TMA office.

Ari and Dana finally part ways in the penultimate episode "Second to Last" when Ari states that despite them being good together and making Dana happy once again, he still loved his wife. A heartbroken Dana, who wanted to have a child with Ari as she was close to 40 years old, encourages him to go back to Mrs Ari. Played by Constance Zimmer. (21 Episodes)

Scott Lavin
First appearing in the season 6 episode "No More Drama," Lavin is a young albeit ruthless and extremely manipulative manager at Murray Berenson's management group. However, he clashes with E on his first day at the company over signing Bob Saget, as Scott had been trying to do for the past month. Being familiar with E as former neighbors (in season 2) and fed up with Scott's repeated calls, Saget himself brushes off Scott and prefers to talk to E about signing on. Scott later mocks Eric over a sexual encounter late in the season. In the seventh season, their rivalry escalates as Scott takes advantage of E's concerns with his wedding by luring Vince away from Eric with Air-Walker, a potential superhero franchise film. Despite agreeing to work together, the partnership sours as Scott is further marked as the catalyst of Vince's erratic behavior, although the partnership seems to have mended over time. As E learns of Murray's reporting to Terrance McQuewick about his work performance, Scott finally recruits him to aid in a takeover of the company, which is implied to have the support of the rank-and-file. It is also implied that while Scott likes Murray to his face, he secretly resents and despises the man because he's often absent from work.

In the final season, Scott and E are busy handling operations at the new Murphy Lavin management agency. As a result, Scott tags along with the rest of the gang. When E decides to go and take care of Sloan in the finale, Scott gets mixed signals from him about actually resigning from Murphy Lavin; E promises to talk about the matter with him when he returns in the future. Played by Scott Caan. (19 episodes)

Adam Davies
First appearing late in Season 1, Davies worked at the Terrance McQuewick Agency (TMA) and represented Drama, purportedly as part of a "family deal". When Ari plans a rebellion codenamed "Tsetse Fly Elite Eight" in the season 2 episode "Exodus," he helps seal Ari's fate after he tips off returning TMA boss Terrance McQuewick to the plan, having been turned off by Ari's abrasive behavior. With Vince deciding to join Ari, Davies drops Drama as well. His deception continues in season 3 when Ari sets up a bigger agency to rival TMA and wants in on it, but Ari rejects Davies, prompting him to squeal to Terrance about Ari's plan. Davies reappears in Season 5, tricking Ari and Vince for false hopes of a meeting for a new project. Their rivalry takes a personal turn in the episode "The All Out Fall Out" when a simple drag race gradually escalates to Davies blackmailing Ari with pictures of Mrs Ari in an old soft-core porn movie, forcing Ari to threaten to beat him up in front of his colleagues at TMA. Davies eventually apologizes. In Season 6, Davies is promoted to being a partner at TMA. When Ari maneuvers to have Zac Efron fire him as his agent, Davies successfully offers Lloyd a job as agent at TMA. He is left uneasy with Ari and Terrance's negotiations of a merger. It is proven true in the season finale "Give a Little Bit," as he is hit by Ari's paintball barrage in firing employees. Played by Jordan Belfi. (14 Episodes)

Jamie-Lynn Sigler
Actress Jamie-Lynn Sigler portrays herself in the show, first appearing in the season 5 episode "First Class Jerk" when her concerns with calling the flight attendants' attention in first class leads to Turtle switching seats with her instead. She gives him a hand-job (and her phone number) during the flight, but gets angry after Turtle admits to the gang that it happened and Drama (who calls her by her character name in The Sopranos) spread the word to skeptical friends. In the episode "Play'n with Fire," Jamie suddenly calls up Turtle and offers to spend the weekend off with him. The date enables Jamie to get to know Turtle more and their friendship develops into a relationship by the end of the season.

In the sixth season, Jamie and Turtle finally make their relationship public as she accompanies him to the premiere of Vince's new movie, Gatsby. The actress is also generous towards Turtle, giving him a new Porsche for his 30th birthday and helps him decide the next step in opening his limo service is to take a business administration course at UCLA Extension. Jamie agrees to be Drama's love interest in Five Towns and attracts the interest of studio executive Dan Coakley, who wanted to talk with her about new projects. When Drama's hardships come over misconceptions about Coakley's supposed ulterior motives on Jamie, she tells Drama that she and Coakley strictly talked about business matters. At the same time, Jamie's relationship with Turtle is also a hot topic on campus, but she herself is jealous of one of Turtle's female classmates making a move on him and adding him on Facebook. Turtle and Jamie break up late in the season over concerns on a long-distance relationship after Jamie agrees to shoot a show in New Zealand. (13 Episodes)

Andrew Klein
First appearing for a lunch meeting with Ari in the season 5 episode "Pie," Klein is depicted as a successful partner at the Klein-Cutler Talent Agency, a stable of TV writers from the Valley. It is revealed in Klein's backstory that he and Ari once worked together at the Terrance McQuewick Agency until Terrance's partner, Jim Oliver, broke away to create his own agency, taking Klein and many other agents as well. Klein admits that the split was not beneficial because Oliver reportedly ripped off clients and employees alike. With the Writers Guild of America strike sapping Klein-Cutler's earnings despite having clients everywhere in Hollywood, Klein seeks a $500,000 loan from Ari and shows his company records to prove he can pay it back in three months. Klein agrees to Ari's offer to buy the company and to undergo a career makeover. The merger is a success despite Babs' reservations about Klein's behavior and similarities with Ari.

By season 6, Klein is the head of the Miller-Gold Agency's television department, but things go bad when he has a brief affair with junior agent Lizzie Grant, the fallout of which severely affects his marriage and professional relationships. Klein is briefly detained in the episode "The Sorkin Notes" after he drives into his house to stop his wife Marlo from burning his papers on Aaron Sorkin, who eventually signs with the agency. However, in the seventh season, it is revealed that Klein went into rehab for sex addiction and was let go for hiring prostitutes using company funds. He also warns Ari about Lizzie's maneuvering. Played by Gary Cole (12 Episodes)

Lizzie Grant
First appearing in Season 6, Lizzie is a junior agent working in the Miller Gold Agency's TV division under Andrew Klein, with whom she has an affair. Its potential ramifications prompt the two to end it in the episode "Running on E", and Ari almost fires her. As a result, she improves her work performance, signing John Stamos as a client. Her ties to Cincinnati and Northwestern University help her convince David Schwimmer to do television again. In season 7, Lizzie's knowledge of the NFL proves vital to Ari's efforts to bring in a team to Los Angeles – and a moment of joy between them causes a rift between Ari and his wife. She eventually resigns from TMA and works for Amanda Daniels in the episode "Dramedy" when Ari refuses her demands to take over the agency's television department after Klein's termination. In addition to trying to get clients out of TMA and suing Ari for unlawful dismissal, it is revealed that Lizzie has blackmail files and audiotapes of his behavior, which she threatens to hand over to the press. However, Lizzie decides that she doesn't want to be involved in Amanda's revenge scheme and makes peace with Ari by giving him her materials, but not before Deadline Hollywood somehow learns about the contents. Played by Autumn Reeser (10 episodes).

Terrance McQuewick
Ari's former partner and boss at the Terrance McQuewick Agency (TMA). A high school dropout, Terrance is a very powerful figure in the industry and one who has been able to make or break careers. In Season 2, Terrance returns from retirement, leading to several confrontations with Ari, and ultimately the termination of Ari's partnership agreement. He offers Ari a settlement of $12 million, but refuses to pay when he learns Ari will use the money to form his own agency. He doesn't appear again in the series until late in Season 6, when he pays Ari a visit at Miller Gold and asks him to buy TMA. Ari accepts the offer, but for a price lower than Terrance wanted after learning he has been cheating on his wife, Melinda Clarke. When Terrance puts an additional contract clause into the buyout, Ari drops the deal. Terrance visits Ari to tell him he specifically wanted him to buy TMA and that he regretted firing Ari years before. In Season 7, Terrance tries to make E sign a pre-nuptial agreement. In the final season, he threatens to kill E because he sired a child with Sloan upon learning about it from Vince. Played by Malcolm McDowell. (11 Episodes)

Minor recurring characters

Sarah Gold
The older of Ari and Melissa Gold's two children, Sarah is depicted as the more sensible member of the family. Being "Daddy's little girl," Ari takes it upon himself to protect her from any unwanted attention at her age, although he claims Vincent Chase is her star crush (revealed in the Season 2 episode "The Bat Mitzvah") In the season 3 episode "Dominated," Sarah begins to like child actor Max Ballard who just moved in across the street from the Gold house, unsettling Ari. Their relationship comes to an end when Max goes to Kazakhstan to shoot a new movie, which unknown to Sarah, was Ari's plan to get him away from her. In the season 4 episode "The Day Fuckers," Ari pulls out Sarah from her exclusive private school upon discovering that her brother Jonah would not be admitted the following school year. She returns in the Season 8 episode "Motherf*cker," when she gets angry at her father because he promised to introduce her to Taylor Lautner (he failed to appear for a meeting at TMA). A heart-to-heart talk between them in the series finale eventually prompts Ari to resign from TMA. Played by Cassidy Lehrman.

Christy
An assistant to Shauna, Christy mostly stays in the background tending to her boss' needs. She is depicted to be just as acerbic as her boss when she rebuffs Turtle's offer for a date. The actress who plays Christy, Kate Albrecht, is the daughter of former HBO President/CEO Chris Albrecht. (14 Episodes)

Amanda Daniels
Amanda becomes Vince's sexy new agent in the second half of the third season. She pushes Vince to do an adaptation of an Edith Wharton novel as his next movie but gets very upset when Vince puts it on hold as Ari reintroduces the Medellin script to him. Amanda feuds with Ari during this time because both want Vince as a client. Amanda and Vince's professional relationship turns into a short romance. However, the two formally part ways in the episode "Return of the King" when Vince wrongfully blames her as the reason he did not land the lead role in Medellin. In season 5, Eric seeks her help in selling an indie script entitled Nine Brave Souls, which Ari doesn't want Vince doing after the Medellin flop. She agrees to read it; if Eric can get her on board he will be able to sign the writers as his newest clients. Amanda reveals that Edward Norton liked the script and wants to call the movie Smoke Jumpers and produce it with the help of a big studio. She becomes Ari's potential rival for studio president Alan Gray's job after he dies of a heart attack. In the episode "First Class Jerk," he tries to convince Amanda that he will not take the job but asks her to get Vince as the second lead in Smoke Jumpers. Still bitter over how she and Vince parted ways, Amanda wants the studio job to ensure the company will no longer work with Vince and Ari. Ari outsmarts Daniels by maneuvering Dana Gordon for the position just to spite Amanda. She strikes back in season 7 when she emerges as Lizzie Grant's new boss, helps her steal TMA clients, and takes over Ari's efforts to open an NFL franchise team in Los Angeles. Amanda loses her respect for Ari in the episode "Porn Scenes in an Italian Restaurant" as he rants about her revenge plots, but admits that she only wanted to bring him back on the NFL plan and reveals that the leakage of Lizzie's blackmail files to Deadline Hollywood was carried out by a recently terminated male assistant who once worked for Ari. Played by Carla Gugino. (12 Episodes)

Jonah Gold
Ari Gold's youngest child and only son. Ari is very uncharacteristically sensitive around him, and has mentioned on many occasions that he loves Jonah a lot. He is played by the son of creator Doug Ellin in the later seasons (11 episodes).

Emily
First appearing in Season 1 as Ari's assistant, Emily meets E during the gang's meeting with Ari when Vince gamely asks her if she has a boyfriend. Over the course of the season, E and Emily gradually get closer and enter into a relationship without Ari knowing. Emily tries to keep business and personal life separate. In the episode "Busey and the Beach", Eric and Emily have a falling out as the situation of business escalates into harsh feelings. Towards the end of the season, Ari discovers their relationship and warns E against trying to date his female assistants. Emily eventually resigns and finds work as James Cameron's assistant in Season 2. Despite her past with E, they work to help Vince land the title role of the movie Aquaman. Played by Samaire Armstrong. (8 Episodes)

Ashley Brooks
Only present in Season 6, Ashley appeared in the series as E's new neighbor when he moves in at a house owned by Sloan McQuewick's friend. She gives E a plant as a housewarming gift, with a hope that E would invite her to the premiere of Vince's film Gatsby. Although he does not invite her, she is able to secure a ticket from a friend at the CAA talent agency and gets jealous seeing E with Sloan at the premiere's after party. She later on calls E to apologize for her rude behavior, blaming it on the alcohol and her being nervous. Vincent finds her bracelet at his house and gives it to E, who ends up going over to Ashley's place in order to return it to her and spend the night with her. E and Ashley begin a relationship in the middle of the season, but jealousy gets the better of her when E admits he still has feelings for Sloan and is rankled by people calling him on the phone. Wanting an honest relationship, Ashley seeks access to E's correspondences, which makes him feel violated. Having been warned by Brittany and Vince that Ashley is going too far with her invasion of privacy, E decides to break up with her for good. Played by Alexis Dziena (8 episodes).

Josh Weinstein
A young agent working at the Triad Agency in Hollywood, Weinstein first appears in the Season 1 episode "The Script and the Sherpa," when he gives E a script for Queens Boulevard, a movie set in Queens, New York. It is revealed that the gang barely remembers Josh, who was once Ari's assistant before the events of the series and turns into his nemesis for the first three seasons. Josh's attempts to undermine Ari include ruining his chances for an article about the best Hollywood agents under 40 years old, trying to sign Vince away from Ari, and tipping off Vince that James Cameron will direct Aquaman. Ari responds in Season 4 by tricking Josh into having his client, Heath Ledger, think that a movie he's being offered a part in, Lost in the Clouds, will simply be another Brokeback, so Heath can decline the offer and Vince to land the role. Josh appears once more in the Season 5 episode "First Class Jerk" when he has Vince set up for a meeting with Frank Darabont about a lead role in a certain project. However, Frank reveals that the project was a TV pilot and berates Josh for not telling Vince everything. Incensed that Josh lied again and tried to tell Vince that his movie days were over, E tells Josh to stay away from them. Played by Joshua LeBar. (6 Episodes)

Alan Gray
The president of Warner Brothers studio, Gray first appears in the second season when he meets Vince to discuss his involvement with the movie Aquaman. Because of the success of Aquaman in Season 3, the studio authorizes the production of the sequel, A2. When Vince learns that A2'''s first shooting day will be the same one as Paul Haggis' shooting of Medellin, he tries to negotiate a modified schedule, only for Alan to make an empty promise. Alan eventually fires Vince and replaces him with Jake Gyllenhaal in the episode "Three's Company." Alan continues his vendetta against Vince in the episode "What About Bob?" as he buys Bob Ryan's script for the Ramones biopic film I Wanna Be Sedated but would simply leave it unproduced to spite Vince. In the Season 5 episode "ReDOMption," Alan plays against Ari in a golf game wherein he will put Vince in the new project Smoke Jumpers if Ari won. However, despite winning the game, Alan rants off against Ari for even bringing up Vince, but has a heart attack on the golf course and dies hours later. Played by Paul Ben-Victor. (6 Episodes)

Kristen
A psychology student at the University of Southern California, Kristen appears in the series as having an on-off relationship with Eric that culminated in numerous breakups. Despite their predicament, Kristen encourages E to work as Vince's manager. At the start of the second season, Kristen - who reportedly cheated on him during the shooting of Queens Boulevard - and E have one more intimate moment before saying goodbye. Played by Monica Keena. (6 Episodes)

Marvin
Vince's accountant. Marvin often berates the gang for their excessive spending, starting in the first season when Vince decides to buy a Rolls-Royce Phantom on lease. A running gag involves Vince and Eric often faking a dropped call to avoid another of Marvin's rants. In the second season, Marvin tries to discourage Vince from buying an expensive house when he had not even landed the title role in Aquaman yet. He later calls Vince on using his American Express Black Card many times. As Vince teeters on bankruptcy in the fifth season, Marvin recommends that he do other income-generating activities - such as guest appearances at parties - to remain financially stable. In the seventh season episode "Dramedy," Marvin cautions Turtle about the state of his finances for his limo business. The inspiration for Marvin comes from Doug Ellin's own father.  Played by Paul Herman (6 Episodes)

Charlie Williams
An actor and stand-up comedian seeking to enter Hollywood, Charlie appears in the fifth season as E's first client for The Murphy Group. By the time of the season, Charlie had spent the past six months auditioning for guest spots and often had to commute. Over the course of the season, Charlie and E successfully pitch a script for a pilot for a new sitcom, but run into some hurdles when Seth Green - who was specifically picked for one of the roles - threatens to replace Charlie with Nick Cannon. The pilot is successfully filmed without Seth and Charlie lands a spot on Jimmy Kimmel Live! to do his stand up act. However, in Season 6, Charlie is the only actor in the pilot rated poorly by test audiences, leading to The CW recasting him. Played by Bow Wow. (5 Episodes)

Bob Ryan
First appearing in the season 3 episode "I Wanna Be Sedated," Bob Ryan is depicted as a legendary movie producer with Oscar-winning movies to his credit. Ari refers him to Eric, with whom he shows a script for a biographical movie about the Ramones, in which Vince would play Joey Ramone. It appears to be a promising project for Vince, but in the episode "What About Bob?" E and Ari fail to sell the script to potential studios because Bob would not stop talking and continues to make nonsensical proposals that start with "What if I told you..." and end with "is that something you might be interested in?" E and Ari successfully pitch the script to Paramount, but due to Ari's lack of respect and contempt for Bob, the humiliated producer sells the script on his own to Warner Brothers. Knowing that studio president Alan Gray will make sure Vince is not involved in the project, Ari fails to convince Bob not to sign a perks package that would finalize the sale. In the season 5 episode "ReDOMption," Bob joins Ari in a golf game against Gray and Phil Mickelson. Bob tries to pitch a romantic golf comedy script to Alan, after he tells Alan they make the Ramones film first.

Bob Ryan is allegedly based on real-life Hollywood producer Robert Evans. Evans turned down an offer to play himself, but allowed his home to be used for filming. When the season episodes aired, Evans took offense at what he perceived as a caricature of himself. HBO countered that he was not a template for the Bob Ryan character. Played by Martin Landau. (4 Episodes)

Nick "Nicky" Rubenstein
First appearing in the Season 3 episode "Return of the King" as the son of movie producer Phil Rubenstein (Bruno Kirby), Nick represents the Rubenstein family in financial issues related to the production of Medellin under Paul Haggis. However, his determination in the episode actually results in the entire production being shelved because of him angering studio president Arthur Gatoff on Yom Kippur. Late in the season, Nick uses his newly opened trust fund to finance Billy Walsh's production of Medellin. The accounts are frozen in the fourth season after he is arrested for cocaine possession while attempting to bring additional funds to Colombia for the shoot. Although he accepts a USD75-million distribution offer from Yair Marx in the episode "The Cannes Kids," he would eventually end up with only a dollar for payment after the failure of Medellin. Played by Adam Goldberg. (4 Episodes)

Harvey Weingard
A credible producer based on Harvey Weinstein, Weingard is depicted as someone who can make box-office hits out of every movie he makes. He has a terrible temper and gets tricked by Vincent and Eric every time they make a deal, as noted in the season 2 episode "The Sundance Kids" and the season 4 episode "Sorry Harvey." In the Season 4 finale, Harvey ends up buying Medellin for only one dollar. Ari goes on to say afterward that Harvey will save the film in the release, but the movie eventually ends up as a straight-to-DVD offering. Played by Maury Chaykin. (4 Episodes)

Rufus
A businessman who debuted in the opening season, Rufus is the owner of Home Video Solutions, a stereo/home entertainment system company whose clients are mainly movie stars. Since Rufus has a soft spot for movie stars, Vince and the gang take advantage of Rufus' offer of a free home entertainment system in exchange for his company name being mentioned on-air during Vince's appearance on Jimmy Kimmel Live! (with Vince wearing a special company cap). In season 3, Rufus operates an auto body shop where Turtle has Drama's Lincoln Continental fixed. His daughter Kelly is the object of Turtle's affection and he reluctantly allows her to go on a date with Turtle despite his reservations. Played by Marlon Young. (4 Episodes)

Saigon
A rapper trying to make it in Los Angeles. In the second season, he and a friend steal a white Maserati, believing it to be that of an Interscope Records executive he was aiming to at least listen to his demo CD. However, it is revealed that they stole the wrong car - it is actually the one used by Vince and the gang, and the executive's car was parked next to it. Turtle is impressed with Saigon's demo tracks and becomes his manager, convincing Billy to use one song in the Queens Boulevard soundtrack. In the third season, as a present to Turtle; Vince arranges for Saigon to appear on Big Boy's morning show, which results in several record companies calling Turtle about signing him. Overwhelmed, Turtle turns to Ari for help. However, in the episode "I Wanna Be Sedated," Turtle's plan to have Saigon sign with Atlantic Records flounders when Saigon's old manager resurfaces and apparently forces Saigon to fulfill his end of the old contract. (4 Episodes)

John Ellis
First appearing in the season 5 episode "Gotta Look Up to Get Down," John is the fictional chairman and CEO of Time Warner who offers Ari the Warner Brothers studio presidency after incumbent head Alan Gray dies of a heart attack. Ari initially turns down the offer, but eventually manipulates it so Dana Gordon would get the job instead of Amanda Daniels. Ellis assigns Dana to work on her first 100-million dollar movie, Smoke Jumpers. However, Vince's problems with director Verner Vollstedt prompts him to stop the production in the episode "Play'n With Fire." Although he doubts Dana's management abilities, Ellis keeps her on the job. In the seventh season, Ellis briefly appears at Ari's NFL meeting. In a post-credits scene in the series finale, Ellis calls Ari in Italy and - in declaring that he wants to retire - asks the former agent to be his successor as chairman. In the movie, however, it is revealed that Ellis offered the chairmanship twice, but decided to groom Ari first by appointing him as studio head. Played by Alan Dale (4 Episodes)

Justine Chapin
A pop singer who seems to be interested in Vince during the first season, Justine is known in the entertainment scene as someone who wants to save her virginity for marriage. She reappears in the Season 5 episode "Unlike a Virgin" reinventing her image as a duet star, working with Tony Bennett for her new album due to her previous albums failing; Turtle and E state that the dismal sales were attributed to common knowledge that she already had sex. She invites Vincent and the boys to her music video after party, at which she tries to set Vince up with one of her friends. At the end of the episode, however, Justine goes off with Vince, claiming she only did it to prevent her from entering a possible future relationship with him. Their friendship does not develop further for the rest of the series. Played by Leighton Meester. (3 Episodes)

Dom
One of the gang's old friends from New York, Dom first appears in the Season 3 episode "DOMinated," when the gang mistakes him for a burglar at their house. It is revealed that Dom was paroled after serving five years in jail for drug possession and assaulting a police officer - something that still makes E doubt he can reform his ways. Although the gang is happy seeing Dom out of jail (he proposes a screenplay about his life behind bars), they feel he has overstayed his welcome when he takes over Turtle's job as driver and becomes the cook instead of Drama, not to mention having sex many times in the house. However, Vince hires him as head of security. Things come to a head in the following episode "Guys and Doll" when movie financier Phil Rubenstein threatens to cut funding for the movie Medellin unless a Shrek doll stolen the night before is returned to him. The gang discovers that Dom stole the doll and Vince lets him go, giving him the Hummer and an apartment as a "severance package" with which to set up his life. Dom's last appearance in the series is in the season 5 episode "ReDOMption," when he is featured in a high-speed chase on the LA freeway with police over mistaken assumptions about his mother-in-law's medical marijuana. Vince later learns Dom used his "severance package" to run a limo service and is raising a family. E bails Dom out despite skepticism over his apparent failure to change his life. Dom tells his wife about his legal troubles; she leaves him, following through with a promise to do so if he ever went to jail again. E states that he will talk to the parole board when Dom is eligible for parole, which, according to Turtle, is not until 2020. He is still in jail by the time of the movie's events, delighting in Drama's video gaffe being aired on TMZ. Played by Domenick Lombardozzi. (3 Episodes)

Seth Green
First appearing in the Season 3 episode "Strange Days," Seth first meets E at the sky bar above a Beverly Hills hotel. He eventually knows that E dated Sloan - with whom he claims he had a relationship years before the events of the series. The gang fights Seth's group in the episode "Vegas Baby, Vegas!" because E could no longer tolerate Seth's requests to pass a message to Sloan. Seth makes his last series appearance in the season 5 episode "Seth Green Day" when he is cast in a new TV series alongside E's client Charlie. Things take a more personal turn when Seth is attacked by Charlie, who was just threatened about his own role being recast with Nick Cannon. Seth is then passed over for a role in Charlie's TV show. (3 Episodes)

Jacqueline
Drama's French girlfriend, he meets her during the season 4 finale in Cannes, France. During the beginning of Season 5, they remain in a relationship, keeping in contact with each other through daily phone calls and webchats. After Drama accuses her of lying to him about her whereabouts, she breaks up with him, claiming he has become a bit of a psychopath. Played by Julia Levy-Boeken (3 Episodes).

Verner Vollstedt
A German director with two Oscar awards to his credit, Vollstedt only appears in the Season 5 episodes "Pie, "Seth Green Day," and "Play'n with Fire" as the director of Vince's new film, Smoke Jumpers. However, tension arises when Verner gives the majority of Vince's lines away to Jason Patric, claiming that he is not a gifted actor (despite the successes of his other films) and tries to point out some of Vince's allegedly bad acting mannerisms to him. Over the rest of the story arc, Vollstedt admits he never wanted Vince to be part of the movie in the first place if not for Ari's deal with Dana Gordon, and even orders Turtle and Drama off the set. He fires Vince after shooting multiple takes of a critical scene without producing what he thinks is tangible results. Since even Ari's intervention would not convince him to give Vince a second chance, Verner scrambles to explain his side to Dana Gordon and studio chairman John Ellis, who eventually stops production of the movie. Played by Stellan Skarsgård (3 Episodes)

Anna Faris
Only appearing in season 4 starting with the episode "The Young and the Stoned," Anna is involved with the gang after accidentally bumping into E's car somewhere in Beverly Hills. Although she agrees to pay the damages, E takes her on as a client but begins to be infatuated with her, which indirectly results in Faris breaking up with her boyfriend. In the episode "No Cannes Do," Billy tries to tap her for a role in Silo, but she admits to not understanding the script. However, E's feelings for her and his personal dislike of the script results in Faris firing him. (3 Episodes)

Pauly Shore
A formerly out-of-work comedian, Shore first appeared in the season 2 episode "Aquamansion," when Hugh Hefner banishes him from the Playboy Mansion for deliberately setting Hefner's pet monkeys out of their cages several years before the events of the series. The incident was blamed on Drama, who slipped past Mansion security to set things straight. Shore is also happy with Adam Davies dropping Drama as a client at the end of the season. In the season 3 episode "Gotcha," Shore hosts a new Punk'd-style reality show called Gotcha that has the tagline, "You got Got!" Shore has Drama as his first target. (3 Episodes)

Brooke Manning
A sorority sister at UCLA during the sixth season, Brooke is one of Turtle's classmates. His on-campus reputation of being Jamie-Lynn Sigler's boyfriend leads her sorority to run a prank by stealing his underwear. She appears to have a crush on Turtle, and Turtle starts to feel the same despite his relationship. After Jamie breaks up with Turtle late in the season, Brooke tries to console him by making love to him, to no avail. She then suggests that since he can't get over Jamie that he should go be with her. Played by Jana Kramer. (3 Episodes)

Scott Wick
A gay Hollywood producer, Wick is one of Ari's friends. In his debut in the Season 1 "The Script and the Sherpa," Wick is revealed to be the producer of Vince's next project, Queens Boulevard - but doesn't like him. Vince is able to secure his support by supplying him with marijuana during a statewide shortage. However, in Season 2, Wick fails to convince director Billy Walsh to provide James Cameron with a print and objected to his decision to make a four-hour film. Played by Stanley DeSantis. (3 Episodes)

Yair Marx
An extremely wealthy man and international playboy from the Middle East, Yair is described by Ari as being a potentially "very dangerous man who might be a prince, an arms dealer, a coke dealer - who knows?" Ari nervously says that Yair "could be Mossad or Hezbollah". After unsuccessfully pitching Sylvester Stallone as Pablo Escobar's father for Medellin, Yair offers to finance the film for USD60 million if Vince will sleep with his wife Nika. He is depicted as the second of three producers who wanted to finance the movie. In the season 4 finale, he puts an offer to pay for their budget and then one for practically double the budget before the screening. Expressing his dismay at the film after the screening, he backs out saying he never signed any papers, telling Ari to sue his company but he won't get anything, since its based out of Dubai. Played by Assaf Cohen. (2 Episodes)

Jake Steinberg
First appearing in Season 6 as one of Ari's substitute assistants during Lloyd's defection to TMA (and was fired within seconds over a snide comment), Jake resumed working for Ari in the seventh season. Unlike those who came before Lloyd and the other replacement assistants over the course of the series, Jake proved to be a reliable assistant until the end of the series. It is revealed in the series finale "The End" that he is scared of Lloyd. Played by Jonathan Keltz (19 episodes)

Tom
Lloyd's boyfriend who first appears in the fourth season as an employee at Finish Line, Inc. In the season, Ari helps him and Lloyd get back together after a brief rift (Tom left Lloyd for cheating on him with another guy). The couple go on a Rosie Cruise in the season finale "The Cannes Kids" as Ari joins the gang in Cannes. As Ari and the gang go to Joshua Tree National Park in the season 5 episode "Tree Trippers," Lloyd is assigned to watch over the family pets, since Mrs Ari and the kids will be out of town for the weekend as well. Tom convinces Lloyd to throw a gay party at the house as revenge for Ari's constant degradations of Lloyd's race and sexual orientation, but it is derailed as Mrs Ari returns in the middle of the night. However, it is implied that they broke up for good by the time of the events of the film. Played by Brandon Quinn. (5 episodes)

Brittany
Only appearing in season 6, Brittany is assigned to Eric as his new assistant at the Murray Berenson Talent Management Company. Although working under him, she helps E meld into the agency's operations and even sends Ari a pink dildo with a note saying "suck it" in response to him sending E a large number of pizzas on his first day at work (seen in the episode "No More Drama"). Both Brittany and E keep their relationship professional, which proves vital when she notices Ashley's jealousy towards any woman connected with E. After E breaks up with Ashley over her paranoia in the episode "Berried Alive," Brittany helps E feel better by asking him and his friends to hang out with her clique, where E warns Vince and Drama against making any passes at Brittany. Played by Kate Mara (4 Episodes).

Marlo Klein
Appearing mostly in Season 6, Marlo is Andrew Klein's wife. She makes her debut in the episode "Amongst Friends," when she meets Mrs Ari in a lunch date Ari planned for them. As it turns out, both Marlo and Mrs Ari become close friends almost immediately. Their friendship proves vital later in the season when Mrs Ari comforts her over Andrew's infidelity. Marlo's anger over his indiscretions prompts her to visit the MGA offices and tries to find the woman who seduced him. Although Ari asks Marlo to forgive Andrew, she bans her husband from their Beverly Hills home and also freezes his funds. In "The Sorkin Notes," Marlo burns Andrew's papers on potential client Aaron Sorkin. Anticipating the return of her husband from rehab in the Season 7 finale, Marlo refuses to help Ari in his own problems with Mrs Ari. Played by Jami Gertz (4 Episodes)

Murray Berenson
Sparingly appearing in Seasons 6 and 7, Murray is depicted as one of the more established talent managers in Hollywood, running his own self-named management company. In the episode Fore!, he becomes E's celebrity partner in a golf game and offers E a job after he closes down The Murphy Group. E eventually relents and takes the job anyway, despite discovering that Sloan (revealed to be Murray's goddaughter) worked to get him in the company. With his help, E eventually signs Bob Saget (who wants to have sex with his girlfriend in Murray's office as a condition to him joining), causing E to incur the wrath of colleague Scott Lavin and E eventually wins Murray over with his honesty. However, late in Season 7, E discovers that Murray has been reporting to Terrance McQuewick about his allegedly poor managerial skills, prompting him to join Lavin's takeover of the company despite his original opposition. Murray's downfall (implied as having taken place between the events of Seasons 7 and 8) also results in E and Sloan breaking up.  Played by George Segal (3 episodes).

Dan Coakley
An NBC network executive, Coakley first appears in the Season 6 episode "Murphy's Lie" when he tries to talk to Jamie-Lynn Sigler regarding a new project. Drama, who approached Sigler to co-star with him in Five Towns'', suspects Coakley's trying to sleep with her and confronts the executive about it. When Drama tries to lay his hand on Coakley, the official taunts him with sexual exploits of himself and Sigler and eventually has the writers make less scenes involving Drama's character. Because of Drama's hardship with not having any meaningful scenes on the show, Ari helps Drama get off the show in exchange for helping Coakley land a membership at an exclusive country club. Played by Matt Letscher (3 Episodes).

Alex
Only featuring in Season 7, Alex first appeared as a new driver at Turtle's limousine service. However, she resigns after Turtle tries to kiss her as comfort for losing her way in one assignment. When Lim-hoes collapses, she comes to Turtle's aid and introduces him to her uncle Carlos' Avion tequila company in Mexico. The company deals with Turtle to help enter the US market with Alex helping out in the promotions. However, in the eighth season, Carlos explains that the reason Alex has been out of touch with Turtle was that she had a new boyfriend. Played by Dania Ramirez (5 episodes).

Johnny Galecki
Only appearing in the final season, Galecki enters the story as the Murphy-Lavin Group's newest client. However, E is reluctant to see him on the talent list because the actor is interested in Sloan. It is later confirmed in "The Big Bang" that Galecki and Sloan have been talking personally about Eric and Sloan's mutual friend, Melinda Clarke, which upsets him. Scott wants to keep Galecki as a client because of the potential earnings he can bring in from his various projects, but E wants to drop him as a client or he will quit the company. In "Second to Last", Eric and Melinda seek to settle the score by crashing Galecki's date with Sloan. Because of the apparent lack of trust, Galecki fires E. (3 Episodes).

References

Lists of American comedy-drama television series characters
Lists of minor fictional characters
 Recurring